The Crasna is a left tributary of the river Bârlad in Romania. It discharges into the Bârlad in the village Crasna. The Mânjești dam is located on the Crasna.

References

Rivers of Romania
Rivers of Iași County
Rivers of Vaslui County